Ron Smith (born 1943) is a Canadian poet, author, playwright, former academic and the founder of Oolichan Books.

Biography
Smith was born in Vancouver, British Columbia. He studied English literature at the University of British Columbia and at the University of Leeds (M.A. in 1970), and returned to Vancouver Island in 1971 to teach in the English Department at Malaspina University-College (now Vancouver Island University) in Nanaimo, British Columbia, where he taught English and creative writing for 28 years. In 2019 he was designated Professor Emeritus by the Senate of VIU.

Smith was also awarded an honorary doctorate by the University of British Columbia in 2002. In 2004 he was invited to teach a semester in the North American Studies post-graduate programme at the University of Pescara, Italy, and the next year he was the inaugural Distinguished Fulbright Chair in Creative Writing at Arizona State University, 2005. 

In 1974 he founded the publishing company Oolichan Books. A successful grant application to the Canada Council in 1975 enabled the press to become an independent publisher. The operation was located in Smith's hometown of  Lantzville, a small seaside village on Vancouver Island. In 2011 he received the Gray Campbell Distinguished Service Award for his contribution to publishing in BC. Smith now lives with his wife, Patricia Smith, also a writer, In Nanoose Bay, BC. He sold the press after 36 years.

From 1988 to 1991 he was the fiction editor for Douglas & McIntyre. He has been called "instrumental" in helping Randy Fred to start the first aboriginal publishing house, Theytus Books, in 1981.

He is the author of a suite of poems, Seasonal (1984), a long poem, A Buddha Named Baudelaire (1988), two other collections of poetry and a collection of fiction, What Men Know About Women (1999), an illustrated children's title Elf the Eagle (2007) which was short-listed for the BC Book Prizes and the Saskatchewan Young Readers Award, The Shining Willow Award, a biography, Kid Dynamite: The Gerry James Story, about a remarkable athlete who at one time held 18 CFL records and in one year competed for the Grey Cup as a Winnipeg Blue Bomber and the Stanley Cup as a member of the Toronto Maple Leafs (2011), and a memoir, The Defiant Mind: Living Inside a Stroke (2016), which was long-listed for the George Ryga award and won the Independent Publisher IPPY Gold Medal in the States for autobiography/memoir (2017). In 2018, an excerpt from The Defiant Mind was translated into sixteen languages and published by Reader's Digest in over twenty countries. In 2020 he co-authored and published a medical memoir with Dr. Bernard Binns entitled: Improbable Journeys: from Crossing the Himalayas on Horseback to a Career in Obstetrics and Gynaecology. A sequel to Elf the Eagle entitled Elf's Family Tree is forthcoming in 2023.

Smith also reviews books, and co-edited the anthology of Canadian West Coast short fiction: Rainshadow: Stories from Vancouver Island (1982). He also edited Poetry Hotel: Selected Poems by Joe Rosenblatt (1985), the Collected Works of Ralph Gustafson, vol. 1 and 2 (1987) and New & Selected Poems by W. H. New (2015).

His poetry was translated by Ada Donati and published in a bilingual edition in Ferrara, Italy, 2002. He also served on the Board of the B.C. Arts Council from 2008 to 2012 and has volunteered for several years as a Lay Reviewer on research applications for the Canadian Heart and Stroke Foundation. Since 2015 he has toured western Canada and the States to talk about his stroke experience with stroke survivors and health professionals.

Bibliography

Anthologies
 Rainshadow: Stories from Vancouver Island. Sono Nis/Oolichan (co-editor, 1982)

Biography
 Kid Dynamite: The Gerry James Story. Oolichan (2011)
 The Defiant Mind: Living Inside a Stroke. Ronsdale (2016)
 Improbable Journeys: from Crossing the Himalayas on Horseback to a Career in Obstetrics and Gynaecology. Rock's Mills Press (2020)

Poetry
 Seasonal. Sono Nis (1984)
 A Buddha Named Baudelaire. Sono Nis (1988)
 Enchantment & Other Demons. Oolichan (1995)
 Arabesque e altre poesie, Schifanoia Editore, Italy (2002)

Fiction

 The Last Time We Talked. Reference West (1996)
 What Men Know About Women. Oolichan (1999)

Children's literature
 Elf the Eagle. Oolichan. (2007) .
 Elf's Family Tree.  Rock's Mills Press. (2023)

Editor

 Poetry Hotel: Selected Poems of Joe Rosenblatt. M&S (1985)
 Collected Poems of Ralph Gustafson, vol. 1 & 2. Sono Nis (1987)
 New and Selected Poems of W. H. New. Oolichan Books (2015)

References

External links
 Address on receiving an honorary degree from the University of British Columbia
 Oolichan books
 Ron Smith's website
 Archives of Oolichan Books founded by Ron Smith (Oolichan Books fonds,  R11783) are held at Library and Archives Canada

20th-century Canadian poets
Canadian male poets
Writers from Vancouver
1943 births
Living people
20th-century Canadian male writers